Andrew Curtis may refer to:

Andrew Curtis (umpire), Australian rules football goal umpire
Andrew Curtis (cricketer), English cricketer
Andy Curtis, English footballer